The Dispute between a man and his Ba or The Debate Between a Man and his Soul is an ancient Egyptian text dating to the Middle Kingdom. The text is considered to fall into the genre of Sebayt, a form of Egyptian wisdom literature. The text takes the form of a dialogue between a man struggling to come to terms with the hardship of life, and his ba soul.

The original copy of the text consists of 155 columns of  hieratic writing on the recto of Papyrus Berlin 3024. This original manuscript is fragmented, with the beginning of the text missing. Further fragments were later published in 2017 including the previously absent beginning of the text. Due to the philosophical nature of the work, it has received significant scholarly attention and is widely considered one of the most important works of ancient Egyptian literature.

The Ba soul 
The ancient Egyptian concept of the soul consisted of nine separate parts. Among these is the Ba, which is commonly translated into English as "soul". The Ba soul was thought to represent one's psyche or personality and was thought to live on after one's death, possessing the ability to traverse between the physical and spiritual planes. The ba soul is traditionally depicted in Ancient Egyptian art as a saddle-billed stork with the head of a human.

Synopsis
The original manuscript opens with the man lamenting that his ba is disobeying him. The man states that he desires to reach the West (I.e. the afterlife) and rebukes his ba for "[restraining him] from death before [he has] come to it". The man remarks upon the possibilities of what death holds, convinced of the value of funerary practices over human life.  He proceeds to promise a bountiful burial and prosperity in death to his ba soul in an attempt to persuade it towards death. The man's ba responds by reminding the man of the sadness death brings and that all men, rich or poor, share the same fate as their legacy will fade from this world regardless of their funerary practices. The ba instead urges the man to forget his thoughts of mortality and enjoy life. The man, unconvinced, cites the evil and hardship of the world and the promises of an afterlife in accordance with ancient Egyptian religious beliefs. The text ends with the man's ba encouraging the man to continue to his religious practices in hope of an afterlife, but to continue his life and not wish for its end before its time.

Significance 
The work has intrigued academics for its place as one of the most significant and introspective early philosophical works. However, the text itself has been translated in many different ways, which have led to clashing academic theories on the text's themes and meaning.

The most traditional translation of the work and most widely accepted interpretation is that the text is a commentary on suicide and the Egyptian funerary cult, as the man yearns for the promises of an afterlife in the face of his earthly suffering. In this interpretation, his ba attempts to dissuade the man of taking his life and convince him of the value of life on the mortal plane. 

More recent translations and scholarly works have disputed the insinuation of suicide in the text. Many modern interpretations instead view the work as the psychological struggle of a man to come to terms with the sorrow that life brings and accept its innate goodness.

Some scholars believe that the psychological turmoil of the man in this text is a metaphor for the unstable political situation - the text was authored in during the 12th Dynasty Egypt following the upheaval of First Intermediate Period.

A common academic theory has been that the dialogue that makes up the text took place before an audience. Recently, with the discovery of new papyrus fragments, this theory has been substantiated as the initial section mentions the presence of a woman named Ankhet, although her role in the work remains somewhat equivocal.

Form
In the translation of Miriam Lichtheim the text is presented as a mixture of styles: prose, symmetrically structured speech, and lyric poetry.

History
The original papyrus copy was bought by the German Egyptologist Karl Richard Lepsius in Egypt in 1843 and is now in the Ägyptisches Museum und Papyrussammlung belonging to the Berlin State Museums. 

The first edition was published during 1859, and subsequently numerously translated, with sometimes widely differing interpretation.

This original papyrus manuscript was missing the initial section of the work, beginning in the middle of the man's monologue. In 2017 Papyrus Mallorca II was identified as belonging to Berlin papyrus 3024. This new addition to the text is an introduction of the characters in third person which was common to literature of the time. The introduction identifies the primary speaker of the text as "the sick man" and a woman named Ankhet who is now thought to be an audience for the debate that would follow.

References

Literature
Allen, James P. (2011). The Debate between a Man and His Soul: A Masterpiece of Ancient Egyptian Literature. Leiden, The Netherlands: Brill. 
M. Lichtheim, Ancient Egyptian Literature, vol.1, University of California Press 1973
James B. Pritchard ed., Ancient Near Eastern Texts Relating to the Old Testament, Princeton University Press 1950

Footnotes

Works_about_suicide
Ancient Egyptian instruction literature